Home for Christmas is the fifth studio album and second Christmas album by Scottish singer Susan Boyle. It was released on 25 October 2013 in Australia, on 29 October in the United States, and on 25 November 2013 in the United Kingdom. The album is a Christmas holiday album featuring a posthumous duet with Elvis Presley who died in 1977 and two duets with Johnny Mathis and The Overtones. The album also features an original song, "Miracle Hymn", written for Boyle's debut acting role in the film The Christmas Candle.

Background
Boyle was granted permission to use recordings of Elvis Presley from Graceland Estates singing "O Come, All Ye Faithful". The single was released on 6 December 2013 in Ireland and on 8 December in the United Kingdom, as a charity single for Save The Children U.K. and for the Elvis Presley Charitable Foundation in the U.S. It is the second time Boyle has covered "O Come, All Ye Faithful". She first covered the song for her second album, The Gift (2010).

Track listing

Notes
"O Come, All Ye Faithful" uses samples from the 1971 Elvis Presley recording of the same name from the album Elvis sings The Wonderful World of Christmas

Personnel
Unless otherwise indicated, information is also taken from Allmusic
Susan Boyle - vocals (tracks 6, 8, 10, 12, lead on tracks 1–5, 7, 9, 11)
Dishan Abrahams - bass guitar (tracks 5, 7)
Steve Anderson - musical arrangement (tracks 2–3, 5, 7, 9-11), music programming (1, 3, 5, 7, 10), drums (3, 5, 7), bass guitar (3), piano (10), keyboards (3, 11)
Graham Archer - recording engineer (track 3)
Steven Blake - bagpipes (track 3)
Kevin Burleigh - recording engineer (track 7)
Carmel Thomas Youth Singers - choir vocals (track 1)
Chris Hill - bass played by (tracks 4, 6, 8)
Ginger Holliday - sampled background vocals (track 1)
The Imperials - sampled background vocals (track 1)
Jake Jackson - recording engineer (track 12), audio mixing (12)
Rob Johnston - choir director (tracks 2, 4–5, 7, 9, 11)
Charlie Kenny - drums (tracks 4, 6, 8)
Sean Kenny - recording engineer (tracks 2-11)
Millie Kirkham - background vocals (track 1)
Adam Looker - assistant recording engineer (tracks 2–3, 12)
Andrew Lucas - choir director (tracks 2, 9, 11)
Lorne MacDougall - bagpipes (track 3)
Avril Mackintosh - recording engineer (tracks 3-12), Pro Tools engineer (1)
Cliff Masterson - musical arrangement (tracks 2-11), music programming (1-3, 7, 9), orchestra conductor (2), piano (2, 5–8), keyboards (3, 11), drums (3, 7), bass guitar (3), organ played by (9)
Johnny Mathis - guest vocals, lead vocals (track 5)
Michael McGoldrick - uilleann pipes (track 7)
Charlie McKerron - fiddle (track 7)
Fred Molin - recording engineer (track 5)
Jimmy Nielson - assistant recording engineer (tracks 2-12)
James Nisbet - guitar (tracks 4–5, 7, 10)
The Overtones - guest vocals, background vocals (track 3)
Elvis Presley - sampled lead vocals (track 1)
Temple Riser - sampled background vocals (track 1)
Royal Philharmonic Orchestra - strings performed by (tracks 2, 5, 7, 11)
RSVP Voices - choir vocals (tracks 2, 4–5, 7, 9, 11)
Donald Shaw - accordion (track 7), recording engineer (7)
St. Albans Cathedral Boys Choir - background vocals (tracks 2, 9, 11)
Mitch Stevens - background vocals (track 7)
Gary Thomas - recording engineer (tracks 2-12)
Tom Trapp - musical arrangement (track 12)
Jeremy Wheatley - audio mixing (tracks 2-12)
Zone 1 Brass - brass performed by (track 1)

Charts

Weekly charts

Year-end charts

Certifications

Release history

References

Susan Boyle albums
2013 Christmas albums
Syco Music albums
Columbia Records Christmas albums
Christmas albums by Scottish artists
Pop Christmas albums